Amin Sherri is a Lebanese Shia politician. He was elected to a parliament in the 2005 Lebanese general election, being fielded as a candidate by Hezbollah.

Hezbollah withdrew Sherri's candidature for the Shia seat in the Beirut II electoral district in the 2009 Lebanese general election, in favour of Amal Movement candidate Hani Kobeissy.

References

Living people
Hezbollah politicians
Year of birth missing (living people)